Emotion Pictures may refer to:
 A book, written by Wim Wenders.
 A song, by the band Comet Gain on the album Broken Record Prayers.
 A video, by the band Silverchair featured on the DVD of The Best of Volume 1.